Fonner Park is a thoroughbred horse racing facility located in Grand Island, Nebraska. Co-located with Eihusen Arena and the grounds of the Nebraska State Fair, it is named after its original land owner August L. Fonner, and first held races in 1954.

Physical attributes
Fonner Park is a  dirt oval. The Fonner Keno Casino and Finish Line Restaurant offers keno and off-track betting. In July 2019, the facility received authorization from the Nebraska Racing Commission to install historical Instant Racing machines, but in February 2020 their installation was delayed due to a pending lawsuit over their legality.

History
The site was purchased by the Hall County Livestock Improvement Association in April 1953. The park was named after August L. "Gus" Fonner, who donated the land. The Old Reliable Hereford Show and Sale was held as its first livestock exhibition in September, before beginning its inaugural season of racing on April 29, 1954. In the years that followed, Fonner was expanded to include additional grandstand seating, expanded barn space, an indoor quarter-mile training track, and other amenities.

In March 1979, Fonner Park began offering Sunday races for the first time. In 1988, the track began simulcasts to Lincoln and Omaha.

Prominence during the COVID-19 pandemic 

On March 16, 2020, live racing at Fonner Park was suspended due to health and safety concerns related to the COVID-19 pandemic. On March 19, the facility announced that it planned to resume races behind closed doors as a "trial" from March 23 through April 1, with races moving from weekends to a Monday–Wednesday schedule, only essential personnel present at the track, and additional safety protocols. While grandstands would be closed to the public, spectators would still be able to watch from the track's parking lot, and use its geofenced betting app while on the grounds. The Fonner Keno Casino and restaurant would remain operational, subject to restrictions. 

As one of the few U.S. tracks to continue racing (and horse racing being one of the few sports to continue in any form amidst the pandemic's arrival in North America), the "boutique" Fonner Park began to receive national exposure, including more frequent simulcasts by TVG Network. The change in scheduling and shift to late-afternoon first posts helped alleviate conflicts with weekend simulcast racing from other tracks still in operation, and helped attract more viewers from the west coast.  

With the resumption of races, Fonner Park experienced a surge in off-track betting activity domestically and abroad; on its first day of races after the resumption, the track handled over $1.3 million—surpassing the track's previous single-day record of $1.2 million. Fonner Park CEO Chris Kotulak noted that the track only received 3% of the revenue from OTB, meaning that higher numbers would be needed to cover purses and employee salaries. In its first two weeks, the average handle increased to $2.1 million per day. Fonner Park simulcasts were also being picked up in countries such as Australia, England, France, and South Africa, while the Grand Island Independent described the track as having temporarily become "the center of the horse racing world".  

On April 1, it was announced that Fonner Park would continue this racing format through April. Kotulak stated that it "exceeded our expectations because we did not expect as many other tracks to cancel racing".  By its sixth week, the average daily handle had peaked at $3.5 million, but to taper off towards $3 million as other tracks resumed racing. From February through April, Fonner Park took a total of $71.3 million in wagers, a year-over-year increase of $63.8 million. It also accounted for 40% of wagers from TVG customers in April 2020 (as opposed to only 5% the year before). 

On April 22, the Nebraska Racing Commission approved the addition of 12 additional days of racing in May, extending Fonner Park's season through May 27.

See also
 Impact of the COVID-19 pandemic on sports

References

External links
 

1954 establishments in Nebraska
Horse racing venues in Nebraska
Sports venues completed in 1954
Sports venues in Nebraska